Euskotren operates frequent commuter rail services in the city of San Sebastián and the surrounding Donostialdea area, in the Basque Country, Spain. The infrastructure is gradually being upgraded to rapid transit standards, in order to create the San Sebastián Metro. As of 2021, the San Sebastián suburban rail services are branded as part of the Euskotren Trena network, with no separate identity.

History 

The meter-gauge line opened on December 5, 1912 between San Sebastián with Irun. It was extended to Hendaye the following year. The network was subsequently owned by FEVE, the Spanish narrow-gauge railway company, until it was transferred to the Basque Government in the 1970s. In the early 1980s, it was integrated into EuskoTren, along with other narrow-gauge lines in the Basque Country.

Since the 2010s, the line has been gradually upgraded towards rapid transit standards. In 2012, together with the opening of a new tunnel between Loiola and Herrera, it was announced that the line would be renamed to Metro Donostialdea. This branding, however, has since been abandoned.

Future developments
A  underground loop through the city centre was originally planned to open in 2022, but is now (as of 2021) scheduled for 2024. When the tunnel is completed, the need to reverse at Amara will disappear.

The works on the new - stretch began in February 2022, with completion scheduled for 2027. This new alignment will simplify operations by absorbing the Altza branch into the main line.

Operations 
There are two numbered lines: E2 and E5.

Due to the existence of various overlapping services, headways vary depending on the time of the day and location. With the opening of the tunnel through the city center, it will be possible to offer regular headways in a longer stretch of the line.

Station list 
The following table shows regular weekday service patterns. The first trains in the morning and the last in the evening make shorter trips.

Trains stop at stations marked with "●" and don't stop at those marked with"｜":

Rolling stock 

The line shares rolling stock with the rest of the Euskotren Trena network. Currently, 900 series trains are used. In the past, 200, 300 and 3500 series trains were used.

Network map

See also 

 Bilbao metro

Notes

References

External links 
 
 
 TOPO

Euskotren
Railway lines opened in 1912
Rapid transit in Spain
Underground rapid transit in Spain
Metre gauge railways in Spain
Rail transport in the Basque Country (autonomous community)
Cross-border rapid transit
1912 establishments in Spain
1500 V DC railway electrification